Bayada may refer to one of the following:

 Bayada, Lebanon, a village in Lebanon
 Bayada, Ma'ale Iron, a village in Israel
 Bayada Home Health Care, a home health care company

See also
 Bayadha, a town and commune in El Oued Province, Algeria
 Bayadha District, El Oued Province, Algeria